The Oaks, also known as the Cooler House, is a historic plantation house located on Saint Helena Island near Frogmore, Beaufort County, South Carolina.  It was built about 1855, and is a two-story, vernacular frame I-House. Edward L. Pierce chose The Oaks as his headquarters during the military occupation of St. Helena during the American Civil War. The Oaks was the center for military and agricultural activities on the island. On June 18, 1862, Ellen Murray, who had ten days earlier arrived from Pennsylvania, opened the Penn School for Freedmen in a back room of the house. The house also served as a hotel for military personnel from Port Royal, superintendents, and teachers.

It was listed in the National Register of Historic Places in 1988.

References

African-American history of South Carolina
Plantation houses in South Carolina
Houses on the National Register of Historic Places in South Carolina
Houses completed in 1855
Houses in Beaufort County, South Carolina
National Register of Historic Places in Beaufort County, South Carolina
1855 establishments in South Carolina